Damian John Bugg  is an Australian barrister who served as the Commonwealth Director of Public Prosecutions between 1999 and 2007. Prior to this appointment, he was the Tasmanian Director of Public Prosecutions from July 1986 to 1999. In 2005, he was appointed a Member of the Order of Australia (AM) for services to the law.  He served as Chancellor of the University of Tasmania between 2006 and 2012.

Biography
He was called to the Bar of the Supreme Court of Tasmania in 1969 and worked for the Hobart law firm Dobson, Mitchell and Allport from 1970 to 1976 as a lawyer specialising in commercial law and litigation, and as senior litigation partner from 1977 until 1986 when he was appointed as the first Director of Public Prosecutions for Tasmania. He took silk in 1994.

Bugg has served as President of the Bar Association of Tasmania, Chairman of the Legal Assistance Scheme and a Member of the Council of the Law Society of Tasmania. He was a Member of the Council of the Australian Institute of Judicial Administration for nine years and is currently a Board Member of the Canadian-based International Society for the Reform of Criminal Law. He chaired the Electronic Recording Committee which implemented the program of video recorded Police interviews in Tasmania in 1987, and established and chaired the Forensic Science Services Committee in 1988, has written and spoken about Victims Rights, Pretrial Disclosure, Committals and Procedural Reform.

Bugg served as Tasmania's first Director of Public Prosecutions, from 1986 to 2001, during which time he successfully prosecuted Martin Bryant in 1996 for the murder of 35 people and the attempted murder of 23 others in the 1996 Port Arthur massacre. As Commonwealth Director of Public Prosecutions between 2 August 1999 to 12 October 2007, Bugg determined in July 2005 that there was insufficient evidence on which to base any prosecution of Steve Vizard, granted indemnities in relation to Schapelle Corby, and decided in 2007 to discontinue prosecuting Dr Muhamed Haneef on alleged offences relating to terrorism. At the expiry of his fixed year term in 2007, Bugg was succeeded by Christopher Craigie, .

In 1998 Bugg was appointed as a Fellow of the University of Tasmania; and in September 2001, Bugg was appointed to the Council of the university, and served as Chancellor from 2006 to 2012. Upon his retirement as Chancellor In December 2012, the honorary degree of Doctor of Laws (honoris causa) was conferred on Bugg by the university.

Following the 2013 Tasmanian bushfires, Bugg was appointed as chairman of the Tasmanian Bushfires Recovery Taskforce.

Personal life
Bugg married Jenny in 1971. They have a son and daughter.

In 2003, Bugg was a recipient of the Centenary Medal, and was later appointed a Member of the Order of Australia (AM) for services to the law.

References

External links
Tasmanian Director of Public Prosecutions site
1999 Annual Remark by Commonwealth DPP

Australian King's Counsel
Australian prosecutors
People from Tasmania
Living people
Year of birth missing (living people)
University of Tasmania alumni
Directors of Public Prosecutions of Australia